Creative Source is the self-titled debut album by Los Angeles, California based R&B group Creative Source. Released in 1973, this album charted at number twenty-one on the R&B albums chart in 1974.  It includes the original version of "You Can't Hide Love" that Earth, Wind and Fire cover a couple years later in 1975.

Track listing
"You Can't Hide Love" - (Skip Scarborough  3:22
"Let Me in Your Life" - (Bill Withers)  3:03
"Lovesville" - (Michael Stokes, Joe Thomas)  3:58 	
"You're Too Good to Be True"  - (Michael Stokes, Joe Thomas)  3:30
"Wild Flower" - (Doug Edwards, David Richardson)  4:39
"Magic Carpet Ride" - (Rushton Moreve, John Kay)  3:10
"Who Is He (And What Is He to You)?" - (Bill Withers, Stanley McKenny)  11:45
"Oh Love" - (Michael Stokes, Joe Thomas)  3:24

Charts

Singles

References

External links
 Creative Source-Creative Source at Discogs

1973 debut albums
Creative Source albums
Sussex Records albums